David Grissom is an American guitarist who has played and toured with several of America's leading bands and recording artists. He is best known for his work with John Mellencamp. He has released four solo albums: Loud Music, 10,000 Feet, Way Down Deep, and How It Feels to Fly. Grissom uses a PRS guitar and has for most of his career.

Career
While still recording with Joe Ely, Grissom joined the John Mellencamp Band. Following Mellencamp, he played briefly with Will and the Kill, then went on to form the critically acclaimed Storyville with Malford Milligan (vocals), David Lee Holt (guitar), Tommy Shannon (bass) and Chris Layton (drums). Grissom has since toured with the Allman Brothers and the Dixie Chicks. On May 19, 2007, at a free concert titled "The Road To Austin", Bobby Whitlock performed his electric arrangements of Layla and Why Does Love Got To Be So Sad with dueling guitars courtesy of David Grissom and Eric Johnson.  Grissom released his first solo album Loud Music in 2007. He has also recorded sessions, played and toured with a number of other American recording artists, including Buddy Guy, Chris Isaak, Sarah Hickman and Bob Dylan. David Grissom recorded his album "Two Thousand Miles" with Owen Temple. In 2009 Grissom released his second solo album "10,000 Feet", which featured 11 new songs plus an acoustic version of "Good Day For The Blues", which was originally recorded by Storyville.

Guitars
Grissom has played PRS (Paul Reed Smith) guitars for most of his professional career. He played a modified PRS McCarty Trem for over a decade. In 2007, after a 25-year relationship working with Paul on the design and improvement of PRS guitars from a touring/session player's perspective, his collaboration with Paul Reed Smith resulted in the DGT (David Grissom Trem) signature model. Its innovations include special pickups developed by Grissom, Dunlop 6100-like fretwire, a nitrocellulose finish, coil taps for both pickups, and two volume knobs to allow the blending of both humbucking pickups. Grissom has noted that this feature was inspired by the sounds Jimmy Page created on the early Led Zeppelin albums.

How It Feels to Fly (2014)
The fourth solo release included eight new studio tracks and four extended live tracks, with covers of the Allman Brother's "Jessica" and ZZ Top's "Nasty Dogs And Funky Kings".

Discography
2000: Texas Boy (Sky Malone With Double Trouble, David Grissom and Riley Osbourne)
2007: Loud Music (Wide Lode Records)
2009: 10,000 Feet (Wide Lode Records)
2011: Way Down Deep (Wide Lode Records)
2014: How It Feels To Fly (Wide Lode Records)
2020: Trio (Live) 2020 (Wide Lode Records)

Guest appearances:

1987: Joe Ely "Lord of the Highway"
1988: Joe Ely "Dig All Night"
1989: James McMurtry "Too Long in the Wastelands"
1990: Joe Ely "Live at Liberty Lunch"
1991: John Mellencamp "Whenever we wanted" 
1992: James McMurtry "Candyland"
1993: Joe Ely "Love and Danger"
1995: Toni Price "Hey"

References

External links and sources
 
 David Grissom on last.fm
 Review of Dave Grissom's CD Loud Music on Guitar Jam Daily
 Interview with David Grissom on Guitar Jam Daily
 

Year of birth missing (living people)
Living people
American blues guitarists
American country guitarists
American male guitarists
American rock guitarists
Musicians from Louisville, Kentucky
Musicians from Austin, Texas
Rock musicians from Kentucky
Songwriters from Kentucky
Singers from Kentucky
Country musicians from Kentucky
Blues musicians from Kentucky
Songwriters from Texas
Guitarists from Kentucky
Guitarists from Texas
Country musicians from Texas
American male songwriters